Sääminginsalo has been said to be the largest true island of Finland (area ). If it is considered as an island, it is the third largest island in a lake in the world. This inland island is located in Southern Savonia region, Eastern Finland and is surrounded by the lake Greater Saimaa (Haukivesi, Puruvesi and Pihlajavesi), and an artificial canal, Raikuun kanava, that was built in 1750s. The most famous sight on Sääminginsalo is the Kerimäki Church, the largest wooden church in the world.

Traditionally, Soisalo in the same lake complex has  been considered the largest island of Finland, but technically it is not a true island because the lakes surrounding it are not on the same level. The same, however, can be said of Sääminginsalo itself as well, as it is detached from mainland by an artificial canal only and does not in this respect differ in any way from peninsulas like Jutland or Peloponnesos.

See also
List of islands in lakes

References

Lake islands of Finland
Enonkoski